The Department of Education 
was one of the departments of the South African government until 2009, when it was divided into the Department of Basic Education and the Department of Higher Education and Training. It oversaw the education and training system of South Africa, including schools and universities. The political head of the department was the Minister of Education, the last of which was Naledi Pandor.

Education in South Africa
Eastern Cape
Education